The Companhia Energética de São Paulo (CESP) is the largest producer of electricity in the state of São Paulo, with total installed power of 7,455 MW, and the third largest in Brazil. It owns and operates six hydroelectric plants integrated into the National Interconnected System.

See also

 Eng Sérgio Motta Dam
 Ilha Solteira Dam

References 

Electric power companies of Brazil
Companies listed on B3 (stock exchange)
Companies based in São Paulo
Government-owned companies of Brazil
Brazilian companies established in 1966
Energy companies established in 1966